"Stay" is a house song performed by French DJ David Guetta, featuring vocals from singer Chris Willis. The track was released as the second single from Guetta's second studio album, Guetta Blaster on September 13, 2004. The single was not released in the United Kingdom. In certain territories, the single was released as a double A-side with the French only single "Money". A music video for the track exists, but it does not feature either Guetta or Willis. The single found the most success on the Belgian Singles Chart, peaking at #10.

Track listing
 Spanish CD single
 "Stay" (album version) – 3:28
 "Stay" (Fuzzy Hair Remix) – 4:57
 "Stay" (Kiko, Guetta & Garraud Remix) – 8:04
 "Stay" (Kiko Dub Remix) – 6:18

 French CD single
 "Stay" (radio edit) – 3:11
 "Money" (radio edit) – 3:05
 "Stay" (remix edit) – 3:28
 "Money" (Dancefloor Killa Remix) – 7:07
 "Money" (video) – 3:19

 12" single
 "Stay" (Fuzzy Hair Remix) - 7:15
 "Stay" (Le Knight Club Remix) - 6:20

Charts

Notes

2004 singles
Chris Willis songs
David Guetta songs
Songs written by Joachim Garraud
Songs written by David Guetta
Songs written by Chris Willis
2004 songs
Perfecto Records singles
Song recordings produced by David Guetta